Barusiban (INN) (code name FE-200440) is a non-peptide drug which is among the most potent and selective oxytocin receptor antagonists known. It was trialed by Ferring Pharmaceuticals as a treatment of preterm labor but failed to demonstrate effectiveness and was not pursued any further.

See also
 Atosiban
 Epelsiban
 L-368,899
 L-371,257
 Retosiban

References

Abandoned drugs
Carboxamides
Tryptamines
Oxytocin receptor antagonists
Tocolytics